Marazuela is a municipality located in the province of Segovia, Castile and León, Spain. According to the 2004 census (INE), the municipality has a population of 61 inhabitants. Total area is 15 km2 (6 sq mi).

References

External links 

 Official website

Municipalities in the Province of Segovia